The women's team sprint competition at the 2022 European Speed Skating Championships was held on 7 January 2022.

Results
The race was started at 18:55.

References

Women's team sprint